Motheo FM is a South African community radio station based in the Free State.

Coverage areas 
Bloemfontein
Botshabelo
Brandfort
Bultfontein
Dewesdorp
Glen
Hobhouse
Theunissen
Windburg
Verkeerevlei
Ladybrand
Thaba-Phathswa
Hobhouse
Wepener
Excelsior
Tweespruit
Edenburg
Jagersfontein
Trompsburg
Smithfield
Boshof

Broadcast languages
English
SeSotho
Tswana
Xhosa

Broadcast time
24/7

Target audience
Whole community, primarily youth
LSM Groups 1 - 7
Age Group 10 - 42

Programme format
40% Talk
60% Music

Listenership Figures

References

External links
 Official Website
 SAARF Website

Community radio stations in South Africa
Mass media in the Free State (province)